Savvas Gentsoglou (born 19 September 1990) is a Greek professional footballer who plays as a defensive midfielder for Super League 2 club Makedonikos.

Club career

AEK Athens
Savvas Gentsoglou was promoted from the AEK Athens youth system to the senior side in 2006, but didn't make his first appearance for AEK until the 2008–09 season. On 25 June 2008, Gentsoglou renewed his contract with AEK until 2014. Gentsoglou was first used as a central defender by coach Dusan Bajevic. Gentsoglou moved to the defensive midfield position in the middle of the 2009–10 season and became a key player of the starting eleven. Gentsoglou scored his first goal for AEK against Atromitos in a 3–2 home win. The following week Gentsoglou scored the equalising goal against Kavala. On 20 May 2010, Gentsoglou signed a new four-year deal.

Sampdoria
On 19 January 2012, Gentsoglou joined Italian side Sampdoria. Gentsoglou did not feature for Sampdoria in the 2011–12 season, and was sent out on loan the following season to Serie B squad Livorno to gain playing experience. Gentsoglou made 35 appearances for Livorno, as the side won promotion to Serie A.

Gentsoglou then returned to Sampdoria for the 2013–14 Serie A season, but after again failing to establish himself in the Doria first eleven, he moved on loan to Serie B side Spezia Calcio in January 2014.

Ergotelis
On 30 August 2014, Gentzoglou returned to Greece to continue his career in the Greek Super League, playing for Ergotelis, signing a two and a half year deal.

Bari
On 23 June 2015, the Serie B club Bari announced the signing of Gentsoglou till the summer of 2018 for an undisclosed fee.

Hajduk
On 8 August 2016, the Prva HNL club Hajduk Split announced the signing of Gentsoglou on a twelve-month loan deal from Bari 1908. On 14 August 2016, Gentsoglou made his Hajduk debut, the 5th round of the Prva HNL, playing the first 66 minutes in a 1–1 draw with NK Osijek at Stadion Gradski vrt, before being substituted for Toma Bašić.

On 27 June 2017, after spending a year on loan at Hajduk, Gentsoglou signed a two-year contract with Hajduk, finalizing his move from Bari. On 23 July 2017, he scored his first goal with the club in all competitions in a Prva HNL 2–2 away draw against Inter Zaprešić. On 18 March 2018, he scored in a 3–3 away draw game against NK Osijek.

APOEL
On 16 July 2018, Savvas terminated his contract with Hajduk, eventually joining APOEL on a two years' contract for an undisclosed fee.

Al-Adalah
On 29 January 2020, Savvas Gentzoglou solved his contract with APOEL and signed with Saudi club Al-Adalah until the end of the season, and the contract will be renewed if the club remain in the country's 1st division. On 10 July 2020, he renew his contract with the club until the summer of 2021, with a contract worth €900,000. On 20 August, he opened the score with a penalty kick in a 2–4 home loss against Al Wahda FC.

Lamia
On 12 June 2021, Lamia from the Greek Super League 1 announced a two-year contract with Gentzoglou.

International career
Gentsoglou was first called up to the Greece U-19 in 2007; he featured in all of Greece's games in qualifying for the 2008 UEFA European Under-19 Football Championship.

Personal life
From 2013 to 2018 was in a relationship with singer Aggeliki Iliadi. On 8 July 2014, Iliadi gave birth to their son, Vasilis Gentsoglou.

References

1990 births
U.S. Livorno 1915 players
APOEL FC players
AEK Athens F.C. players
Panachaiki F.C. players
A.O. Nea Ionia F.C. players
PAS Lamia 1964 players
Association football midfielders
Croatian Football League players
Ergotelis F.C. players
Expatriate footballers in Croatia
Expatriate footballers in Cyprus
Expatriate footballers in Italy
Expatriate footballers in Saudi Arabia
S.S.C. Bari players
Greek expatriate footballers
Greek expatriate sportspeople in Croatia
Greek expatriate sportspeople in Cyprus
Greek expatriate sportspeople in Italy
Greek expatriate sportspeople in Saudi Arabia
Greek footballers
HNK Hajduk Split players
Living people
Footballers from Alexandroupolis
Serie A players
Serie B players
Spezia Calcio players
Super League Greece players
Delta Ethniki players
Gamma Ethniki players
U.C. Sampdoria players
Al-Adalah FC players
Saudi Professional League players
Saudi First Division League players
Cypriot First Division players